Charles Moffett (September 6, 1929 – February 14, 1997) was an American free jazz drummer.

Biography 
Moffett was born in Fort Worth, Texas, where he attended I.M. Terrell High School with Ornette Coleman. Before switching to drums, Moffett began his musical career as a trumpeter. At age 13, he played trumpet with Jimmy Witherspoon, and later formed a band, the Jam Jivers, with fellow students Coleman and Prince Lasha. After switching to drums, Moffett briefly performed with Little Richard.

Moffett served in the United States Navy, after which he pursued boxing before studying music at Huston-Tillotson College in Austin.  Moffett married in 1953 (Coleman was best man, and performed at the wedding), then began teaching music at a public school in Rosenberg, Texas

In 1961, Moffett moved to New York City to work with Ornette Coleman, but the saxophonist soon went into a brief retirement period. Moffett worked with Sonny Rollins, appeared on Archie Shepp's album Four for Trane, and led a group that included Pharoah Sanders and Carla Bley.  When Coleman returned to performing in 1964, he formed a trio with Moffett and bassist David Izenzon. Moffett also performed on vibraphone.

Moffett began teaching music at New York Public Schools as a way to make ends meet when Coleman made only sporadic performances. Moffett taught at P.S. 58 (Carrol School) in Brooklyn and at P.S. 177 M (under the Manhattan Bridge and now defunct). He also taught at a Brooklyn High School. Moffett moved to Oakland, California, where he served as the city's music director, and was later the principal of the alternative Odyssey public school in Berkeley in the mid-1970s. The title of his first solo album The Gift is a reference to his love of teaching music. His then 7-year-old son Codaryl played drums on that album. Moffett later returned to Brooklyn, NY and taught at P.S. 142 Stranahan Junior High School (Closed in 2006) and at P.S. 58 Carroll School.

His children are double bassist Charnett Moffett, drummer Codaryl "Cody" Moffett, vocalist Charisse Moffett, trumpeter Mondre Moffett, and saxophonist Charles Moffett, Jr.

Discography

As leader
1969: The Gift (Savoy) with Paul Jeffrey, Wilbur Ware, Dennis O'Toole
1975: The Charles Moffett Family-Vol. 1 (LRS)
 Moffett & Sons (Sweet Basil/Apollon)

As sideman
With Ahmed Abdullah
Ahmed Abdullah and the Solomonic Quintet (Silkheart, 1988)
with Ornette Coleman
 Town Hall 1962 (ESP Disk)
 Chappaqua Suite (CBS)
 An Evening with Ornette Coleman (Polydor International)
 The Paris Concert '65 (Magnetic)
 Live at the Tivoli '65 (Magnetic)
 At The Golden Circle, Stockholm Volumes One and Two (Blue Note)
 Who's Crazy? Vol. 1 & 2 (Jazz Atmosphere)
 Lonely Woman (BAT)

with Eric Dolphy
 Memorial Album (FM)

with Archie Shepp
 Four for Trane (Impulse!)

with Prince Lasha
 It Is Revealed (Zounds)
 Firebirds w/ Sonny Simmons (Contemporary)
 Firebirds Vol. 3 (Birdseye)

with Harold McNair
 Affectionate Fink (Island)
With Joe McPhee
Legend Street One (CIMP, 1996)
Legend Street Two (CIMP, 1996)

with the Charles Tyler Ensemble
 Charles Tyler Ensemble (ESP Disk)

with the Bob Thiele Emergency
 Head Start (Flying Dutchman)

with Frank Lowe
 Decision in Paradise (Soul Note)
 Bodies & Soul (CIMP)

with Sonny Simmons
 Ancient Ritual (Qwest/Reprise)
 Transcendence (CIMP)
 Judgement Day (CIMP)

with Keshavan Maslak
 Blaster Master (BlackSaint)
 Big Time (Daybreak)

with Kenny Millions
 Brother Charles (Hum Ha)
 Masking Tape Music (Hum Ha)

References 

American jazz drummers
Free jazz drummers
People from Fort Worth, Texas
Savoy Records artists
1929 births
1997 deaths
Avant-garde jazz drummers
20th-century American drummers
American male drummers
Jazz musicians from Texas
20th-century American male musicians
American male jazz musicians